N. Sivan Pillai (4 February 1918 – 13 March 2004) was an Indian politician and leader of Communist Party of India. He represented  Paravur constituency in 1st, 7th and 8th KLA. 

He took an active part in the freedom struggle in the 1936s.  He joined the Congress Party in 1938 and participated in most of the major freedom movements (including the Quit India Movement) in Kerala at that time and was imprisoned for seven years.  He was an active participant in the Paliam movement for a responsible government in Travancore.  He has been in hiding for a year and a half.  He was also the Chairman of the Government Assurance Committee from 1982 to 1984.  He has received the Thamra Patra Award from the Government of India and a political pension.

References

Communist Party of India politicians from Kerala
1918 births
2004 deaths